Emmanuel Sowah Adjei (born 16 January 1998) is a Ghanaian footballer who plays as a right back.

Club career
He made his league debut on 21 August 2016 in the fourth game of the Jupiler Pro League 2016–17 season for Anderlecht against Eupen.

Career statistics

Honours

RSC Anderlecht 
 Belgian Pro League (1): 2016–17

References

1998 births
Living people
Ghanaian footballers
Ghanaian expatriate footballers
R.S.C. Anderlecht players
K.A.S. Eupen players
Belgian Pro League players
Expatriate footballers in Belgium
Ghanaian expatriate sportspeople in Belgium
Association football defenders